Burrup may refer to:

 Burrup Peninsula (Murujuga), an island in the Dampier Archipelago, Western Australia
 Electoral district of Burrup, Western Australia 1996-2005
 Eddie Burrup, a pseudonym under which Elizabeth Durack painted in the 1970s and '80s

See also